Te spùo so 'na recia (I Spit on Your Ear) is an album by Catarrhal Noise.

Track listing
Rujo (1:55)
Fonso 1 (0:31)
Bea come el pecato (3:15)
Va bon? (4:10)
Fonso 2 (0:33)
Re d'Italia (3:29)
El troia (3:20)
Nutrie (3:15)
Bira vin whisky graspa (2:26)
Rubrica de l'agricoltore (3:59)
Do sborae (3:07)
Cilliegina (1:55)
Foxy Duilio (2:47)
No talia bochino (2:43)
Ti me domandi (1:00)
Pornasso (3:12)
El me brocon (2:57)

Credits
Bullo, vocals
Albyzzo, guitar
Ruzo, bass
Pelle, drums
Giffo, percussions
Herman Medrano, guest vocals on Nutrie.

Uncredited guests
Duilio, guest vocals on Foxy Duilio

2004 albums
Catarrhal Noise albums